WD 1054–226, also known as LP 849-31, is a relatively cool magnitude 16 white dwarf star with a hydrogen atmosphere, in the small southern constellation of Crater located approximately 117 light years away at right ascension 10h57' and declination −22°53' (J2000 epoch). The name WD 1054–226 is based on the coordinates in the J1950 epoch. The star was recognized as a white dwarf along with 32 other nearby white dwarfs (or double white dwarfs) in 2007.

In 2022 it was reported that the flux of light coming from the star varies continually due to partial obscuring by a ring. The pattern of variation repeats with little change every 25.02 hours. Curiously, there are dips in the light flux every 23 minutes, exactly 65 per period of 25.02 hours. The explanation of this strong 65th harmonic is unknown and the authors of the paper say that the phenomenon is puzzling. It seems to be caused by clumps of matter orbiting the star. The researchers have hypothesized that the clumps are being influenced by a moon-sized object, possibly an exoplanet. If it has a period of 25 hours then it is orbiting in the habitable zone of the system. If this is confirmed, it would be the first time that a planet has been found orbiting  in the habitable zone of a white dwarf.

References

External links

White dwarfs
Crater (constellation)